The Great Trek: One of the Greatest Feats in Australian Exploration is a 1940 book by Ion Idriess about Francis and Alex Jardine's 1864 trek in the northern Cape York Peninsula, from Rockhampton to Somerset in 1864.

References

1940 non-fiction books
1940 children's books
Books by Ion Idriess
1864 in Australia
Australian children's books
Australian non-fiction books
Australian travel books
Angus & Robertson books